The 2014 Dakar Rally was the 36th running of the event and the sixth successive year that the event was held in South America. The event started in Rosario, Argentina on January 5 and finished in Valparaíso, Chile on January 18 after 13 stages of competition. Marc Coma won his fourth title in the motorcycle category riding a KTM; Ignacio Casale took his maiden title in the quad category on a Yamaha; Nani Roma clinched victory in the car category for the first time, ten years after his sole motorcycle title, driving a Mini; and Andrey Karginov took his first truck category title for Kamaz.

Entries

Bikes

Quads

Cars

Trucks

Stages
Distance according to the official website. Competitors in the bike and quad categories will cross the Bolivian border and finish the seventh stage at Uyuni, whilst those in the car and truck categories will return to Salta. All competitors will then reconvene in Calama at the end of the eighth stage.

Notes:

Anton Shibalov set the fastest time for the stage, but de Rooy was declared the winner of the stage as the time the Dutchman spent helping stricken rival Mardeev was later deducted from his stage time.
Ignacio Casale set the fastest time for the stage, but Husseini, along with Sonik and Lafuente, were retroactively awarded time by the organisers for a mistake in the road book.
Casale was retroactively awarded the stage win after time was deducted from his finishing time.
Marc Coma set the fastest time for the stage before being awarded a 15-minute penalty for an engine change.
Cyril Despres set the fastest time for the stage before being awarded a 5-minute penalty.

Summary

Bikes

Honda rider Joan Barreda quickly established a lead in the overall classification with wins in the first and third stages, leading reigning champion Cyril Despres by 13 minutes by the end of the latter. A navigation error in the fourth stage set the Spaniard back however, eroding his advantage to just three minutes over Marc Coma as Despres lost some 28 minutes with engine failure.

Coma then assumed the lead of the rally with a resounding victory in stage five, Barreda dropping 41 minutes behind his countryman due to more navigation problems. Barreda was able to reduce the gap by four minutes over the course of the next two stages, before losing further ground on the ninth stage with a 15-minute speeding penalty.

This gave Coma a lead of 55 minutes, which Barreda was able to reduce to 37 minutes before losing two and a half hours with electrical problems on the penultimate stage. This promoted Coma's team-mate Jordi Viladoms to second, almost two hours adrift of the winner by the end of the rally, and Yamaha's Olivier Pain to third.

Despres won three stages on his comeback to fourth, ahead of top Honda rider Hélder Rodrigues. Barreda wound up seventh after taking victory on the final stage, his fifth of the rally.

Quads

Marcos Patronelli, who hit the front of the overall classification after winning the second stage, had to abandon the competition after suffering an accident in the third stage. The Argentinean saved his own life by jumping from his quad, which fell 600 metres down a cliff. The accident left fellow Yamaha rider Rafał Sonik in first place, but the pole lost time on the fifth stage with a navigational error.

This allowed Sergio Lafuente, winner of the fifth stage, to assume the lead in the standings, but three successive stage wins for Ignacio Casale allowed the Chilean rider to usurp the Uruguayan, his advantage up to almost 25 minutes when Lafuente was forced to retire due to a broken engine on Stage 11.

This allowed Sonik to retake second place, over an hour behind Casale, where he would remain until the end of the rally as Casale took victory. Two-time stage winner Sebastien Husseini, who dropped out of victory contention after losing over three hours to the leaders on the fifth stage, completed the podium finishers.

Cars

X-Raid Mini driver Stéphane Peterhansel began the defence of his title strongly by taking the lead of the overall classification with victory in the second stage of the rally, but lost 25 minutes to team-mate Nani Roma on the third stage with a navigational error and a series of punctures. Two-time World Rally champion Carlos Sainz also lost ground, but made up for it by winning the next stage in his SMG Buggy, deposing Roma from the lead of the rally.

Roma was able to re-assert himself on Stage 5 as all of his key rivals dropped time - Sainz lost an hour with an electrical problem and lost a further hour to a penalty, Peterhansel lost a further 24 minutes and X-Raid's Nasser Al-Attiyah, third after Stage 4, was hit with a one-hour penalty.  Peterhansel was however able to reduce Roma's 31-minute lead over the following days with two stage victories, the Spaniard's advantage all but wiped out by the end of Stage 10.

The X-Raid team then chose to call off the fight between its drivers, effectively guaranteeing Roma victory. Peterhansel at first appeared to ignore these instructions as he won the penultimate stage to take a 26-second lead into the final day, but then dropped back to allow Roma back in front. Al-Attiyah won two stages on his recovery drive to third place, just under an hour behind Roma, giving the X-Raid team a clean sweep of the podium.

Giniel de Villiers was the best non-Mini driver in fourth place after winning the final stage, with Orlando Terranova and Krzysztof Holowczyc making it five X-Raid drivers in the top six overall. Sainz was forced to retire after suffering a heavy crash on Stage 10.

Trucks

Winning two of the first four stages, Iveco's Gerard de Rooy quickly established a healthy cushion in the overall classification of over 30 minutes from the leading two Kamaz drivers, Andrey Karginov and defending champion Eduard Nikolaev. Successive wins for Karginov on the eighth and ninth stages saw de Rooy's lead slashed to just 13 minutes, with Karginov seizing the lead of the standings by just under eight minutes after taking a fourth win on stage 11. On the final day of the rally, Karginov lost nine-and-a-half minutes to de Rooy on the road after providing assistance to a stricken car, costing him victory until race officials awarded him back the time he had spent aiding his fellow competitor. This meant de Rooy was forced to concede victory by three minutes.

Nikolaev, who took his maiden Dakar stage win on stage 7, was third, over 90 minutes away from compatriot Karginov by the end of the rally, while Kamaz men Dmitry Sotnikov, winner of stage five, and Anton Shibalov, completed the top five. The remaining Kamaz driver, Ayrat Mardeev, was an early retiree after a series of rolls on the second stage.  Aleš Loprais completed the top six for Tatra with a pair of late stage wins, albeit five hours down on the victorious Karginov.

Stage results

Bikes

Notes
Includes a 15-minute penalty for speeding.

Quads

Notes
 Casale lost 30 minutes in relation to Sonik because of a penalty.

Cars

Notes
Terranova took a 15-minute penalty for colliding with a motorcycle rider during the stage, dropping him to fourth in the overall classification.

Trucks

Final standings

Bikes

Quads

Cars

Trucks

Fatalities

Belgian motorcycle rider Eric Palante was found dead on the morning of 10 January after the completion of the fifth stage. He was 50 years old.

References

External links
 

Dakar Rally
Dakar Rally
Dakar
Dakar Rally
January 2014 sports events in South America